David Arnold (born 1 October 1946) is a historian and has held the position of Professor of Asian and Global History at Warwick University since 2006. Previously he held the position of professor of South Asian History at the University of London's School of Oriental and African Studies. He was one of the founding members of the subaltern studies group in the 1970s, remembered by Ranajit Guha in 1993 as "an assortment of marginalised academics". Arnold contributed seven articles in total to the publication and co-edited the eighth volume with David Hardiman in 1994. He later described this period as consisting of "the most inspiring and supportive atmosphere I have ever been in".
 
He is also an early contributor to the field of colonial medicine, most influentially Colonizing the Body.

See also
 Science and technology studies in India

References

1946 births
Historians of South Asia
20th-century Indian historians
Living people